Esfey Tesfay (born 20 July 1996) is an Eritrean footballer who plays for the Eritrean national team. He debuted on 4 September 2019, in a 2022 FIFA World Cup qualification and scored an own goal against Namibia in 1-2 defeat.

References

External links
 

1996 births
Living people
Eritrean footballers
Eritrea international footballers
Association football midfielders
Asmara Brewery FC players
Sportspeople from Asmara
Eritrean Premier League players